PreZero Rheinlandhalle is an arena in Duisburg, Germany which was named by PreZero, part of the family-owned multinational retail group Schwarz Gruppe.  It is primarily used for ice hockey and is the home arena of Füchse Duisburg (English: Duisburg Foxes). It opened in 1970 and holds 4,800 people.

Previous names 
 Eissporthalle Duisburg (1971–) 
 SCANIA-Arena (–2017) 
 Kenston-Arena (2017–2019) 
 Jomizu-Arena (2019–2021)

The Arena was renamed to KENSTON ARENA by the beginning of the Hockey Season 2017/18.

References

External links 
 Official website

Indoor arenas in Germany
Indoor ice hockey venues in Germany
Buildings and structures in Duisburg
Sports venues in North Rhine-Westphalia